() is a Turkish folk tune. There are similar folk tunes known as Sivas bar.

Lyrics

Original form

See also
Kaşık Havası
Konyali

References

Turkish songs
Year of song unknown